Edward George Effros (December 10, 1935, Queens, New York City – December 21, 2019, Portland, Oregon) was an American mathematician, specializing in operator algebras and representation theory. His research included 
"C*-algebras theory and operator algebras, descriptive set theory, Banach space theory, and quantum information."

Biography
Edward Effros grew up in Great Neck, New York. He finished his undergraduate study in three years at Massachusetts Institute of Technology and received his Ph.D. from Harvard University in 1962. His thesis On Representations of -algebras was supervised by George Mackey. Effros was a postdoc at Columbia University and then became a faculty member at the University of Pennsylvania. Effros married Rita Brickman in 1967. Their two children, Rachel and Stephen, were born in Philadelphia. In 1980 Edward Effros became a full professor at the University of California at Los Angeles (UCLA), and in 1979 the family relocated to Los Angeles. Rita Brickman Effros received her Ph.D. in immunology from the University of Pennsylvania. Eventually, she became a professor of pathology and laboratory medicine at the David Geffen School of Medicine at UCLA. In 2013 Edward Effros retired from UCLA as professor emeritus.

He was a Guggenheim Fellow for the academic year 1982–1983. In 1986 he was an invited speaker at the International Congress of Mathematicians in Berkeley, California. He was the author or coauthor of over 80 publications and supervised the doctoral dissertations of 16 students, including Patricia Clark Kenschaft. He was elected to the 2014 Class of Fellows of the American Mathematical Society.

According to Masamichi Takesaki,

Edward's older brother, Robert Carlton Effros (born 1933), became a lawyer and member of the legal department of the International Monetary Fund. Edward's identical twin, Richard M. Effros, graduated from NYU School of Medicine and became a pulmonologist. Edward was married to Rita née Brinkman for 52 years. Their daughter Rachel Marian Effros (born 1969) became a pediatrician. Their son Stephen David Effros (born 1972) became a senior project manager for Portland Public Schools in Portland, Oregon. In June 2019 Edward and Rita relocated to Portland, but Edward died 6 months later. Upon his death he was survived by his wife, daughter, son, and two granddaughters.

Selected publications

Articles

Books

References

1935 births
2019 deaths
20th-century American mathematicians
21st-century American mathematicians
Mathematical analysts
Operator theorists
People from Queens, New York
People from Great Neck, New York
Massachusetts Institute of Technology alumni
Harvard University alumni
University of Pennsylvania faculty
University of California, Los Angeles faculty
American identical twins